The 2011 Canarian Island Cabildo elections were held on Sunday, 22 May 2011, to elect the 9th Island Cabildos of El Hierro, Fuerteventura, Gran Canaria, La Gomera, La Palma, Lanzarote and Tenerife. All 157 seats in the seven Island Cabildos were up for election.

Overall

Island Cabildo control
The following table lists party control in the Island Cabildos. Gains for a party are displayed with the cell's background shaded in that party's colour.

Islands

El Hierro

Fuerteventura

Gran Canaria

La Gomera

La Palma

Lanzarote

Tenerife

See also
2011 Canarian regional election
Results breakdown of the 2011 Spanish local elections (Canary Islands)

References

Canary Islands
2011